HMS Barfleur was a 90-gun second-rate ship of the line of the Royal Navy, designed by Sir Thomas Slade on the lines of the 100-gun ship Royal William, and launched at Chatham Dockyard on 30 July 1768, at a cost of £49,222. In about 1780, she had another eight guns added to her quarterdeck, making her a 98-gun ship; she possessed a crew of approximately 750. She was a ship of long service and many battles.

In June 1773, King George III reviewed the British fleet at Spithead. Barfleur, under Captain Edward Vernon, was on this occasion the flagship of the fleet commander, Vice-Admiral Thomas Pye.

She distinguished herself as the flagship of Rear-Admiral Samuel Hood on the Leeward Islands station during the American War of Independence. Under Captain John Knight, she was flagship at the indecisive action of 28 April 1781 off Martinique against the French fleet of Rear-Admiral Comte de Grasse, at which Barfleur lost five men killed.

She next took part in the battles of the Chesapeake, St. Kitts and the Saintes. At the Battle of the Chesapeake on 5 September 1781, under Captain Alexander Hood (later Lord Bridport), she was again the flag of Samuel Hood, second in command to Rear-Admiral Thomas Graves, 1st Baron Graves. The battle was won against the French under de Grasse, which had a profound effect on the outcome of the American war.

She saw further action in the French Revolutionary and Napoleonic Wars, taking part in Richard Howe's victory at the Glorious First of June as the flagship of Rear-Admiral (W) George Bowyer, with Captain Cuthbert Collingwood in 1794. In this battle she engaged the French  on 29 May and took a major part in the general action of 1 June, with a total loss of 9 killed and 25 wounded.

She later saw action under Lord Bridport at the Battle of Groix. In 1797 she was with Admiral Sir John Jervis at the Battle of Cape St Vincent.

In 1805, under Captain George Martin, she was part of the Channel Fleet. Her final battle was fought in a squadron under Admiral Sir Robert Calder at the Battle of Cape Finisterre on 22 July 1805 in the attack on the combined Franco-Spanish fleet off Ushant. The action was fought in heavy weather, part of the time in thick fog. The master and four others were killed and Lieutenant Peter Fisher and six others were wounded.

In 1807 under Captain Sir Joseph Sydney Yorke she served in the Channel Fleet. In 1808, under Capt. D. M'Cleod, she served as the flagship of Rear-Admiral Charles Tyler and was engaged in the blockade of Lisbon and the escort to Plymouth of the first division of the Russian squadron commanded by Vice-Admiral Dmitry Senyavin. In 1811, under Captain Sir Thomas Hardy, she was engaged in actions in support of the army under Lord Wellington at Lisbon.

After the conclusion of the Napoleonic wars, Barfleur spent some years in ordinary at Chatham, and was finally broken up there in January 1819.

Notes

References

Lavery, Brian (2003) The Ship of the Line - Volume 1: The development of the battlefleet 1650-1850. Conway Maritime Press. .
Michael Phillips. Barfleur (98) (1768). Michael Phillips' Ships of the Old Navy. Retrieved 31 August 2008.

External links
 

Ships of the line of the Royal Navy
Barfleur-class ships of the line
1768 ships